Glinka is a rural locality (a selo) and the administrative center of Glinkovsky District of Smolensk Oblast, Russia. Population:

History
Glinka was founded in 1898 as a settlement serving Sovkino railway station and was renamed, together with the station, in 1907 to commemorate the composer Mikhail Glinka who was born in the selo of Novospasskoye close by. It belonged to Yelninsky Uyezd of Smolensk Governorate. In October 1928, Yelninsky Uyezd was abolished and split between Smolensky, Roslavlsky, and Vyazemsky Uyezds.

On 12 July 1929, governorates and uyezds were abolished, and Glinkovsky District with the administrative center in Glinka was established. The district belonged to Smolensk Okrug of Western Oblast. On August 1, 1930 the okrugs were abolished, and the districts were subordinated directly to the oblast. On 27 September 1937 Western Oblast was abolished and split between Oryol and Smolensk Oblasts. Glinkovsky District was transferred to Smolensk Oblast. Between 1941 and 1943, during WWII, Glinka was occupied by German troops. On 21 August 1961, Glinkovsky District was merged into Yelninsky District, but on 20 October 1980 it was re-established.

Climate
Glinka has a warm-summer humid continental climate (Dfb in the Köppen climate classification).

<div style="width:70%;">

Economy

Industry
There are no large-scale industrial enterprises in the district. There are plans to build a cement plant and to develop timber industry.

Transportation
The railway connecting Smolensk and Sukhinichi via Spas-Demensk passes through Glinka. There is infrequent passenger navigation.

Glinka has connections to roads connecting Yelnya and Pochinok, as well as Yelnya and Safonovo (with further access to the M1 highway connecting Moscow and Smolensk).

References

Notes

Sources

Rural localities in Smolensk Oblast